Fifth Avenue Place is a high-rise skyscraper complex in Calgary, Alberta, Canada. It was originally called Esso Plaza. It occupies the entire area of a city block, between 4th and 5th Avenue South and 1st and 2nd Street West in Downtown Calgary.

The buildings are managed by Brookfield Properties.

Towers

Construction started in 1979 and the complex was completed in 1981, at the height of the 1980s oil boom. Although the towers are almost identical, they are arranged in an "L" shape, with the West Tower oriented east–west, and the East Tower places on a north–south direction. Fifth Avenue Place was built in late modernist style and has curtain walls with alternating vision glass on all sides. The three level underground parkade provides 793 parking stalls. The two towers are connected by a two level shopping galleria, which is connected by the Plus 15 skywalk network to nearby structures.

See also
List of tallest buildings in Calgary
 Imperial Oil Building, the Imperial Oil Company's former Toronto headquarters

References

External links
Fifth Avenue Place

Skyscraper office buildings in Canada
Headquarters in Canada
Skyscrapers in Calgary
Office buildings completed in 1981
ExxonMobil buildings and structures
Brookfield Properties buildings